Under Lock and Key is the third studio album by American heavy metal band Dokken, released on November 22, 1985, through Elektra Records. The album reached No. 32 on the U.S. Billboard 200 and remained on that chart for 67 weeks. Two singles also charted: "The Hunter" and "In My Dreams", both reaching No. 25 and 24 on Billboards Mainstream Rock respectively, with "In My Dreams" at No. 77 on the Billboard Hot 100. Under Lock and Key was certified Gold on March 4, 1986, and Platinum on April 14, 1987.

Critical reception

The album received mostly positive reviews. Eduardo Rivadavia in his review for  AllMusic calls Under Lock and Key "quite possibly Dokken's most 'complete' album, with a little something for every type of fan", like "fist-pumping headbangers",  extraordinary "bittersweet mid-paced rockers" ("Unchain the Night" and "The Hunter") and "saccharine ballads". Rivadavia recommends the album as the best introduction to new listeners of Dokken, but notes that heavy metal purists would likely prefer the band's 1984 album Tooth and Nail. Canadian journalist Martin Popoff considers the album "too weighted towards Def Leppard's fat-and-open formula rock", resulting "a bit subdued and predictable" in comparison with its predecessor. The band's glamorous look, the media exposure and George Lynch's "attempt to define the L.A. sound in his own image" do not save Under Lock and Key from sounding "like the work of a band just fed".

Track listing

Personnel

Dokken
Don Dokken – lead vocals
George Lynch – guitars
Jeff Pilson – bass, background vocals
Mick Brown – drums, background vocals

Additional musicians
Chris Currell – Synclavier programming

Production
Neil Kernon, Michael Wagener – producers, engineers, mixing
Mark Wilczak – assistant engineer and mixing
Cliff Bonell, Michael Lardie – assistant engineers
Bob Ludwig – mastering at Masterdisk, New York

Charts

Album

Singles

Certifications

Accolades

Unchain the Night

The music videos produced for the singles from the three Dokken albums were featured on a longform videocassette release, Unchain the Night, by Elektra/Asylum Records through Elektra Entertainment. That video debuted on Billboards Top Music Video—Longform chart at No. 11 in January 1987, peaking at No. 5 that May. The video collection was certified Gold in April 1987, and Platinum the following April. In 2007 the collection was re-released in DVD by Rhino Home Video through Warner Music Vision, debuting on the Billboard Comprehensive Music Videos chart at No. 27.

VHS track listing
"Into The Fire"
"Just Got Lucky"
"Breaking The Chains"
"Alone Again"
"The Hunter"
"In My Dreams"
"It's Not Love"

Certifications

See also
List of glam metal albums and songs

References

Dokken albums
1985 albums
Elektra Records albums
Albums produced by Neil Kernon
Albums produced by Michael Wagener